Scopula toxophora is a moth of the  family Geometridae found in Cameroon.

References

Endemic fauna of Cameroon
Moths described in 1919
toxophora
Insects of Cameroon
Moths of Africa